Cândido Mota is a municipality in the state of São Paulo in Brazil. The population is 31,346 (2020 est.) in an area of 596 km². The elevation is 479 m.

References

External links
  Cândido Mota Town Council Website

Municipalities in São Paulo (state)